Le Musk is an 2022 Indian virtual reality thriller film co-produced and directed by film composer A. R. Rahman.
 The film stars Nora Arnezeder, Guy Burnet, Munirih Grace  and Mariam Zohrabyan.

A preview of Le Musk was shown 27 April 2017  at the ‘NAB’, Las Vegas in a room with multi-sensory 'Positron Voyager' VR motion platform. At 72nd Cannes Film Festival, Rahman unveiled 'Scent of a song' from the film.

Plot
The film follows the journey of an orphaned child, full-time heiress and part-time musician, who grows up to be a diva on a mission. All through, she has one constant companion – the lingering Muskan scent. However, her life takes a dramatic turn when she receives an anonymous message, which brings back her mysterious past.

Cast

 Nora Arnezeder as Juliet
 Guy Burnet
 Munirih Grace
 Mariam Zohrabyan
 Edoardo Landolfi

Production

Development

In 2015, A. R. Rahman was planning to create a theatre with projections all around and scent added to it, after being suggested by his wife Saira to make a film on perfumes. Three months later, someone gave Rahman a virtual reality gear which prompted him and his wife to make a virtual reality film based on perfumes. In order to blend the olfactory element in his film, Rahman got in touch with Grace Boyle, who is the founder director of Feelies, a London based company that has developed the technology to disperse scent during a film.

Filming

The entire film was shot in Rome in a span of 13 days using a pair of Jaunt ONE cameras, with each of them being fitted with 24 camera sensors so as to capture 8K quality video.

References

External links

https://www.facebook.com/LeMuskTheFilm/

Upcoming films
English-language Indian films
Films scored by A. R. Rahman
Films set in Rome
Entertainment One films
Virtual reality films
Films set in Italy
Films shot in Rome
Films shot in Italy